Pictures of You is an Australian talk show program that aired on the Seven Network on 27 March 2012. It was hosted by Brian Nankervis in front of a studio audience and was produced by Working Dog Productions. This interview-style series features well-known personalities who share their old photos, along with personal stories from their formative years.

In March 2013, the series was cancelled after not being renewed for a second season.

Personalities who appeared on the show included Anh Do, Cal Wilson, Carl Barron, Frank Woodley, Denise Scott, Julia Morris, Peter Helliar, Ross Noble, Russell Gilbert and Shane Jacobson.

References

Seven Network original programming
Australian television talk shows
2012 Australian television series debuts
English-language television shows